The 1968–69 English football season was Aston Villa's 69th season in the Football League, this season playing in the Football League Second Division.
Villa had been in decline for several years; the club had an ageing five-man board "who had failed to adapt to the new football reality". The club had neither developed a scouting network nor an effective coaching structure.

Events on the pitch came to a head in November 1968. With Villa lying at the bottom of Division Two, the board sacked Cummings. On 21 November 1968 the problems in the boardroom were highlighted when board member George Robinson resigned. Following his resignation, the board issued a statement: "[The board] would make available, by their resignation, such seats as new financial arrangements might require". Aston Villa F.C. was up for sale. After much speculation London financier Pat Matthews bought control of the club. He brought in local travel agent Doug Ellis as chair of the new board that was convened on 16 December 1968. Two days later Tommy Docherty was appointed as manager, his third club in six weeks, after his resignation from Rotherham United and a brief spell at Queens Park Rangers.

Second Division

References

External links
AVFC History: 1968-69 season

Aston Villa F.C. seasons
Aston Villa F.C. season